Nora is a 2000 film directed by Pat Murphy about Nora Barnacle and her husband, Irish author James Joyce. It stars Ewan McGregor as Joyce and Susan Lynch in the title role.

Plot
In Dublin, 1904, James Joyce walks down Nassau Street and meets Nora Barnacle, a young woman from Galway. Joyce, immediately in love, offers to 'show her the city'. Nora coldly states that she has to work. The film then proceeds to examine the relationship between the two.

Cast

Reception

Nora received an extremely limited release, in 8 cinemas, from May 4th to the 6th, 2000. It grossed only $15,120.

Awards

Won
 Cherbourg-Octeville Festival of Irish & British Film (2000): Best Actress - Susan Lynch
 Irish Film and Television Awards (2000): IFTA Award Best Actress - Susan Lynch

Nominated
 Cherbourg-Octeville Festival of Irish & British Film (2000): Best Film - Pat Murphy
 Irish Film and Television Awards (2000): IFTA Award Best Actor - Ewan McGregor
 Irish Film and Television Awards (2000): IFTA Award Best Craft Achievement - Consolata Boyle (costume design)
 Irish Film and Television Awards (2000): IFTA Award Best Craft Achievement - Jean-François Robin (cinematography)
 Irish Film and Television Awards (2000): IFTA Award Best Feature Film
 Irish Film and Television Awards (2000): IFTA Award Best Screenplay Pat Murphy and Gerard Stembridge
 Karlovy Vary International Film Festival (2000): Crystal Globe - Pat Murphy

Reference list

External links

2000 films
Irish biographical drama films
Films relating to James Joyce
Films set in the 1900s
Films set in Dublin (city)
Films shot in the Republic of Ireland
Films set in Ireland
Films set in Trieste
Biographical films about writers
2000s English-language films